Statistics of Turkish First Football League in the 1999–2000 season.

Overview
It was contested by 18 teams, and Galatasaray S.K. won the championship. And demotion of Altay S.K., Göztepe A.Ş., Vanspor was decided.

League table

Results

Top scorers

References
turkfutbolu.net by Alper Duruk
Turkey - List of final tables (RSSSF)

Turkey
Süper Lig seasons
1999–2000 in Turkish football